Mijenjam (English translation: I'm Changing) is the sixth studio album by Montenegrin singer Boban Rajović. It was released in December 2010.

Track listing
Oprosti mi (Forgive Me)
Mijenjam (I'm Changing)
Zdravo mila (Hello Dear)
011 (featuring Ivana Selakov)
Princeza (Princess)
Luda glava (Crazy Head)
Kraljica i kralj (Queen and King, featuring Alka Vuica)
Kafanski fakultet (Kafana College)
Jedan je život (Only One Life)
Ptica selica (Migratory Bird)
Kumovi (Friends)
011 - Winter Mix (featuring Ivana Selakov)

References

External links
Boban Rajović's discography

2010 albums
Boban Rajović albums